Gründenmoos is a sport facility in St.Gallen, Switzerland.
It is used mainly for football and American football is the training ground for St Gallen Bears  American football club, FC St. Gallen and for FC Winkeln. The stadium has a capacity of 4,500. Since 1981 it is used for the CSIO Switzerland horse show jumping event.

References 

 
 
 

Buildings and structures in St. Gallen (city)
Sports venues in Switzerland
Football venues in Switzerland
American football venues in Switzerland
Sport in St. Gallen (city)